Zhao Ziye (born 1 October 2003) is a Chinese footballer currently playing as a forward for Hebei.

Club career
Zhao was selected as one of fifty young Chinese footballers to join the academy of Spanish side Atlético Madrid, as part of Wanda Group's "China Football Hope Star" initiative to encourage the development of young Chinese footballers.

On his return to China, he joined Hebei, and went on to score his first goal for the club in August 2022, in a 4–3 loss to Tianjin Jinmen Tiger.

Career statistics

Club
.

References

2003 births
Living people
Chinese footballers
Association football forwards
Chinese Super League players
Atlético Madrid footballers
Hebei F.C. players
Chinese expatriate footballers
Chinese expatriate sportspeople in Spain
Expatriate footballers in Spain
21st-century Chinese people